Arnljot Eggen (13 August 1923 – 4 February 2009) was a Norwegian journalist, teacher and poet who also wrote plays and children's books.

Personal life
Eggen was born at Tolga in Hedmark, Norway. He was the son of Eystein Eggen (1886–1973) and Emma Kvernmo (1890–1979). He was raised in the mountain village of Ålen where his  father was a tradesman. He took examen artium in 1944. Further  schooling was interrupted during the Occupation of Norway by Nazi Germany. In 1949 he married nurse Esther Louise Eriksen. He died in Oslo in 2009.

Career
Eggen had plans to become a journalist and held a temporary position  with Østerdølen and Fjell-Ljom. From 1950 he worked as a teacher in primary school, including at Vinstra and in Vardal  later at  Bærum. From  1960 until 1965, he was employed at the Norwegian Museum of Cultural History  in Bygdøy.

He made his literary debut in 1951, with the poetry collection Eld og is. He wrote in both standards of written Norwegian, Bokmål and Nynorsk. He was awarded the Norwegian Critics Prize for Literature for the children's book Den lange streiken. He received the Melsom Prize in 1971 for the songbook , and again in 1995 for the poetry collection Det flyktige varige. In 1985 he received the Dobloug Prize for his authorship.

In the 1970s he became affiliated with the Workers' Communist Party (now the Red party). He was considered one of the leading left-wing poets in Norway at the time, and was a pioneer of political theatre, the best known play being 1973's Pendlerne. He also had a column in the daily left-wing newspaper Klassekampen.

Awards
Melsom Prize – 1971
Norwegian Critics Prize for Literature – 1981
Dobloug Prize  (Shared with Bergljot Hobæk Haff) – 1985

References

1923 births
2009 deaths
People from Tolga, Norway
Norwegian columnists
Norwegian educators
Norwegian male poets
Norwegian children's writers
20th-century Norwegian poets
Workers' Communist Party (Norway) politicians
Dobloug Prize winners
Norwegian Critics Prize for Literature winners
20th-century Norwegian journalists